Clifton Andrew "Lefty" Byers (September 6, 1905 – May 25, 2000) was an American professional basketball coach for the Akron Goodyear Wingfoots in the United States' National Basketball League (NBL). He was the NBL Coach of the Year in 1937–38. During Byers' tenure, the Wingfoots transitioned from the Midwest Basketball Conference (MBC) in 1936–37 into the NBL in 1937–38 (its inaugural season). Byers led the Wingfoots to win the first-ever NBL championship in 1938. The year before, the team had also won the MBC championship.

As a player, Byers competed in basketball, track, and baseball for Kansas State University in the 1920s. In basketball, he was named to the All-Missouri Valley Conference first-team twice, as both a junior (1926) and as a senior (1927). He then played semi-professionally for the Akron Firestone Non-Skids in 1930–31 and 1931–32 while they were an amateur industrial league team.

Head coaching record
The below season records reflect Byers' tenure as head coach when the Akron Goodyear Wingfoots were in the NBL. In 1936–37 they were still members of the MBC and that season is not counted toward official NBL coaching records.

|-style="background:#FDE910;"
| align="left" |Akron
| align="left" |1937–38
| 18||13||5||||align="center" |2nd in Eastern ||5||4||1|||| data-sort-value="1" align="center" |Won NBL Championship
|-
| align="left" |Akron
| align="left" |1938–39 
| 28||14||14||||align="center" |2nd in Eastern ||—||—||—||—|| align="center" |Missed Playoffs
|-
|-class="sortbottom"
| align="center" colspan="2"|Total
| 46||27||19|||| ||5||4||1||||

References

1905 births
2000 deaths
Akron Firestone Non-Skids players
Akron Goodyear Wingfoots coaches
American men's basketball coaches
American men's basketball players
Baseball players from Kansas
Basketball coaches from Kansas
Basketball players from Kansas
Kansas State Wildcats baseball players
Kansas State Wildcats men's basketball players
Kansas State Wildcats men's track and field athletes
People from Abilene, Kansas